The 2470 class is a class of diesel locomotives built by Clyde Engineering, Eagle Farm for Queensland Railways between 1980 and 1983.

History
The 2470 class were an evolution of the 2450 class. They differed in having lighter alternators and smaller fuel tanks. A 2470 class was built by Clyde Engineering for the Townsville Harbour Board, this was later sold to Queensland Rail and renumbered as 2507.

Between 2000 and 2002, six were rebuilt as 2300 class locomotives at Redbank Railway Workshops.

References

Clyde Engineering locomotives
Co-Co locomotives
Diesel locomotives of Queensland
Queensland Rail locomotives
Railway locomotives introduced in 1980
Diesel-electric locomotives of Australia
3 ft 6 in gauge locomotives of Australia